The Illinois State Senate Election of 2014 determined, along with 40 senators not up for re-election, the membership of the 99th Illinois State Senate. The Democratic Party retained its majority, losing one seat with defeat of Mike Jacobs of East Moline by Neil Anderson.

Despite winning a majority of the votes cast in this election, the Republicans remained in the minority, even within the Class of Senators elected this year.  There was no possibility of control of the chamber changing hands.  Each party only ran 13 candidates, and for control of the Senate to have passed to the Republican Party, it would have to have won eighteen seats of the 19 elected in this election.

Overview

General election

References
Illinois State Board of Elections

Illinois Senate elections
2014 Illinois elections
Illinois Senate